Elizabeth Styring Nutt (1870 – 1946), was an artist and educator, known for her leadership of the Nova Scotia College of Art in Halifax.

Biography
Elizabeth Styring Nutt was born on the Isle of Man in 1870. Following the death of her father she moved to Sheffield. Nutt attended the Sheffield School of Art, Newlyn School of Art, and the Sorbonne.  In 1914 she received her Masters of Arts at the University of Sheffield.

Nutt began her teaching career in Sheffield at the Firs Hill Branch Art School, then the Sheffield School of Art and the Sheffield Training College for Teachers. In 1919 Nutt accepted Arthur Lismer's offer to succeed him as the Principal of the Victoria School of Art and Design. In 1925 Nutt changed the name of the school to the Nova Scotia College of Art. She remained at the Nova Scotia College of Art until 1943. During this time Nutt authored several books; Flower Drawing with the Children (1916), Significance (1921), The Why in the Drawing Lesson (1929), and The World of Appearance (1935).

Nutt was a founding member of the Maritime Art Association. She was also a member of the Nova Scotia Society of Artists, the Nova Scotia Society of Watercolour Painters, and an associate of the Royal Canadian Academy of Arts.

Nutt's work was exhibited at the Nova Scotia Society of Artists, the Royal Canadian Academy, the Ontario Society of Artists, the Art Association of Montreal, the Sheffield Society of Artists, the Royal Academy of Arts (London), and the Paris Salon.

In 1945 Nutt returned to the United Kingdom. She died in Sheffield in 1946.

Collections
Her work is included in the collections of the Museums Sheffield, the Doncaster Museum and Art Gallery and the National Gallery of Canada.

References

Bibliography

External links

1870 births
1946 deaths
19th-century Canadian women artists
20th-century Canadian women artists
19th-century Canadian painters
20th-century Canadian painters
British emigrants to Canada
Canadian women painters
Manx artists
Members of the Royal Canadian Academy of Arts